Herman Hertzberger (born 6 July 1932) is a Dutch architect, and a professor emeritus of the Delft University of Technology. In 2012 he received the Royal Gold Medal of the Royal Institute of British Architects.

Biography

Herman Hertzberger was born on 6 July 1932 in Amsterdam.

He completed his studies at the Delft University of Technology in 1958, where he was a professor from 1970 to 1999.

From 1959 to 1963 he is a part of the infamous FORUM editorial, together with Aldo van Eyck and Jaap Bakema. They stir up the architectural discussion at the time, especially concerning the reconstruction of dwellings after the Second World War.

Career

Hertzberger and Aldo van Eyck influenced the development of the Dutch Structuralist movement of the 1960s and 1970s. Among his buildings are the experimental houses known as "Diagoon Houses" (1971), the Montessori school in Delft (1966–70) and the administration building for the Centraal Beheer Insurance Company building in Apeldoorn (1970–72).

Hertzberger has been criticized for the inelegance of the façades of his buildings, and for concentrating on their functions and interiors rather than aesthetics.

Books 
His books include:
 Lessons for Students in Architecture, 1991, 
 Space and the Architect: Lessons in Architecture 2, 1999, 
 Space and Learning, 2008, .
 (with Arnulf Lüchinger and Rijk Rietveld) Herman Hertzberger 1959–86, Buildings and Projects, The Hague, 1987.

A book about the Diagoon Houses:
 Space for living - The experimental Diagoon Houses of Herman Hertzberger, 2023 2nd edition, {{ISBN 978-90-9035455-2}}

Awards
Richard Neutra Award for Professional Excellence 1989, California State Polytechnic University, Pomona
RIBA Royal Gold Medal 2012
Thomas Jefferson Medal in Architecture 2015, University of Virginia

He is an Accademico d'Onore, or honorary member, of the Accademia delle Arti del Disegno of Florence.

Buildings

References

External links

 Architectuurstudio HH
 Video portrait of Herman Hertzberger (Dutch Profiles)
  Diagoon Houses Herman Hertzberger

1932 births
Living people
Dutch architects
Structuralists
Delft University of Technology alumni
Academic staff of the Delft University of Technology
Members of the Academy of Arts, Berlin
Architects from Amsterdam
Articles containing video clips
20th-century Dutch people